Giovanni Graber (born 26 March 1939 in Valdaora) was an Italian luger who competed during the 1950s and the 1960s. He won a medal in the men's doubles event at the FIL World Luge Championships with a gold in 1962.

Graber competed in two Winter Olympics in the men's doubles event, finishing tied for fifth in 1964 and eighth in 1968.

References

Wallenchinsky, David. (1984). "Luge: Men's Two-seater". In The Complete Book the Olympics: 1896-1980. New York: Penguin Books. p. 576.

Italian male lugers
Lugers at the 1964 Winter Olympics
Lugers at the 1968 Winter Olympics
Living people
1939 births
Olympic lugers of Italy
People from Olang
Italian lugers
Sportspeople from Südtirol